Talla Cleuch Head is a hill in the Manor Hills range, part of the Southern Uplands of Scotland. As ascents are either long or steep from all other sides, Talla Cleuch Head is normally climbed from the Megget Stane to the south-east, which allows for a deer fence to be followed to the summit.

References

Mountains and hills of the Southern Uplands
Mountains and hills of the Scottish Borders
Donald mountains